Anthony Max North  is a retired Australian judge, who served as a Judge of the Federal Court of Australia from 3 October 1995 until 11 September 2018. He held appointments as a Judge of the Supreme Court of the Australian Capital Territory and the Industrial Relations Court of Australia.

North graduated as Bachelor of Laws and Bachelor of Arts from the University of Melbourne. In 1973 he served as associate to Sir Ninian Stephen, then a Judge of the High Court of Australia. He graduated as Master of Laws from the University of London in 1975.

In 1976 he was admitted to the Victorian Bar. He held the part-time statutory appointment as Defence Force Advocate between 1993 and 1995.

He retired from the Court in September 2018.

In 2019 North was appointed by the Governor of Victoria as Chair of the Victorian Law Reform Commission.

See also
List of Judges of the Federal Court of Australia
List of judges of the Industrial Relations Court of Australia
List of Judges of the Supreme Court of the Australian Capital Territory

References 

Judges of the Federal Court of Australia
Living people
Alumni of the University of London
Judges of the Industrial Relations Court of Australia
20th-century Australian judges
21st-century Australian judges
Year of birth missing (living people)